'TED is a nonprofit devoted to the philosophy of 'ideas worth spreading' through short, powerful talks that began in 1984, including topics related to 'Technology, Entertainment and Design'. TED talks now cover a wider range of ideas, from "science to business to global issues"

Free online access to TED talks on TED and YouTube has enabled TED to reach a wider audience compared to its exclusive live conferences in the USA that cost $8,500 per year for a standard membership. TED has allowed independent organisers to expand the name and concept with TEDx talks, which opens the door to local events all over the world at a fraction of the price of attending a traditional TED event. TEDx was 'designed to help communities, organisations and individuals to spark conversation and connection through local TED-like experiences'

TEDxTauranga is an independent TEDx event held every 1-2 years in Tauranga, New Zealand. At TEDxTauranga, live speakers and entertainers combine to spark deep discussion and connection in a small group. The TED Conference provides general guidance for the TEDx program, but individual TEDx events, including TEDxTauranga, are self-organised by local volunteers. Other independently organised TEDx events in New Zealand include TEDxAuckland and TEDxWellington.

History 
TEDxTauranga was founded as an independent event by license holder Sheldon Nesdale in 2013. Sheldon attended three TEDx events in Auckland as a member of the audience before gaining the tools necessary to establish a TEDx event in his home town: Tauranga, New Zealand

Each TEDx event is based around a theme, that changes each year. The next TEDxTauranga event is scheduled for 16 September 2023. Previous TEDxTauranga themes include: RE:IMAGINE (2021), RE:ACTION (2019) Perspective (2017), What Fits Your Future (2016), Think, Thrive, Transform (2015), and Great Minds do not Think Alike (2014).

Approximately 683 people attended the 2019 TEDxTauranga event, held at the Holy Trinity Church on 215 Devonport Road to listen to the perspectives of 11 speakers covering a range of topics. Ticket availability is limited to create an intimate experience and spark deep discussion and connection with the ideas presented by the speakers

TEDxTauranga "brings together people from many different socioeconomic and cultural backgrounds and this alone gets the conversations going". "All the people who come to speak on the TEDx stage are extremely passionate about what it is they do, what they think and getting those ideas out there". "Speakers are given 15 to 18 minutes to present their ideas in the most innovative and engaging ways they can". Leading New Zealand scientist, Sir Ray Avery was among the speakers team for the 2015 TEDxTauranga conference.

Events and Speakers

2021 

 Sandra Clair - "Integrating plant-based medicine into New Zealand’s healthcare system"
 Angela Loucks Alexander - "Escaping the Hidden Prison of Auditory Processing Disorder"
 Meng Foon - "Racism in Aotearoa New Zealand, everyone can make a difference"
 Matt Watkins - "3D Printing Houses with Recycled Plastic"
 Vitale Lafaele - "The Invisible Leader"
 Akash Dutta - Pushing the Boundaries of Contemporary Jazz

2019 
 James Russell - "Predator Free New Zealand’s bold plan to restore birdsong to Aotearoa"
 Kat Clarke - " Your Words have the Power to end suffering of LGBTQ youth"
 Rob Weinkove - "CAR T-cell therapy: Reprogramming the immune system to treat Cancer "
 David Downs - "Don't Humour the Tumour "
 Alex Hotere-Barnes - "Beyond Cultural Paralysis: a path towards just relationships"
 Olly Hills - "The Adventures of a 12 year old Cicada hunter"
 Stacy Sims - "Women are Not Small Men: A paradigm shift in the Science of Nutrition"
 Danielle Appleton - "Is New Zealand Dairy in danger of being milked out of existence?"
 Nick Bowers - "Dreams, Drones and Dialogue"
 Kathryn Berkett - "Neuroscience of Device Zombies"
 Leo Murray - "Living with less is living with more: Co-creating a new story for Humanity"
 Sam Sheaff - "Flyaway" (slam poetry)
 Austin Taylor - dance
 Sia’amelie Tongan Dance Group

2017 

 Claire Baker – "Common...NOT Normal"
 Mike Seawright – "Crossing No Mans Land"
 Shelly Davies – "Write like a Reader"
 Nick Harvey – "The Unspoken Conversation"
 Lynn Berresford – "The Gifted Adult"
 Toku Tu – Maori Kapa Haka Fusion
 Aisha Te Kani – "Unstuck"
 Mayank Thammalla – "Saving a Sinking Nation – Re-purpose an Oil Rig!"
 Debra Lampshire – "Hearing Voices: An Insiders Guide to Auditory Hallucinations"
 Chris Battershill – "A Search for Answers Within the Prehistoric Sea Sponge Chemistry"
 Plum Jam – Cool Jazz
 Freddy Matariki Carr – Hula Hoopla

2016 

 Mike & Sharon Barton – "Who is the real Polluter; the Farmer or the Consumer"
 Donna Miles-Mojab – "The Hijab as a Political Instrument"
 Michael Hershman – "Sport, the ultimate expression of fairness is anything but fair"
 Joshua Konowe – "Trust in Business"
 The Jason McIver Collective – "Blues with a Side of Rock and a Twist of Dub"
 Bryan Winters – "The Power of Numbers"
 Johan Morreau – "The First 1000 Days"
 Robin Youngson – "Perfectly broken and ready to Heal"
 Jody Jackson-Becerra – "Fagogo – An Extra-ordinary Story, Aue!"
 Armon Tamatea – "Psychopaths and three reasons why we need them"
 Michael Jones – "The Kiwi answer to Pain Management"
 Te Kahu Rolleston – "Spoken Word Poetry"
 Shama Sukul Lee – "Engineering my Struggle – A First World Problem"
 Heather Hendrickson – "Phages: Nature's Ninjas in the battle against Superbugs"
 David Boothway – "Stolen Rivers"

2015 

 Ellis Bryers – "Our cultural identity as New Zealanders. Our Kiwi-Tanga"
 David Pattemore – "The pollination puzzle. Unexpected alternatives to honey bees"
 Catherine Iorns – "Using human rights law to protect New Zealand's natural environment"
 Ray Avery – "Disruption, Innovation, Spin-offs. 3 ways NZers make dreams real"
 Bronwen Connor – "How to turn skin cells into brain cells"
 Harold Hillman – "Should you fit in or stand out? Finding your authentic voice"
 Marcus Winter – "The Battle of Gate Pa Told With Sand"
 Michael Quintern – "The 600 million year old technology beneath our feet"
 Jason Edgecombe – "Do you always read the label? When diagnosis can suppress recovery"
 Phil & Tilley – "Best way to iron a 2 day old shirt? Wear it"
 Rachel van der Gugten – "Fart free: Why good digestion is essential"
 Stephen Lethbridge – "How to create a workforce that can answer ungoogleable questions"
 Enspire BOP – "There's a Problem in our Backyard"
 Rhythm Interactive – "Can 1000 people who just met, make music together?"

2014 

 Ben Warren – "Modern lives are longer lives? Why that might NOT be true for you"
 Dr Rodney Ford – "Daily bread – Can any human body handle gluten?"
 Puawai Cairns – "Forgotten grandfathers – Maori men of WW1"
 Dr Ian G McLean – "Love your children? Keep their enemies close"
 James Ross – "Learning differently – what if words leaped up and came to life?"
 Vikki Kelly – "The 3-second kiss – why our future depends on it"
 Marty Hoffart – "Still a clean, green NZ? 3 opportunities to rescue our slipping image"
 Nicole Masters - "Down and dirty - a pile of reasons to fall in love with soil"
 Dr Liza Schneider - "Sustainable healthcare for our pets - it's not in the bag"

2013 

 Tommy Kapai Wilson - "Edu-tainment is the silver lining of the long white cloud"
 Nik Gregg - "Compassionate Business"
 Peter Blakeway - "Should we eat our pets?"
 Dean Parchomchuk & Charlotte Yates - "Tokelau, bringing solar power to a nation"

References

External links 
 TEDxTauranga website
 TEDxTauranga Zero Waste Zone

Organisations based in New Zealand
TEDx conferences